Layard is a surname. Notable people with the surname include:

 Austen Henry Layard (1817–1894), British archaeologist, author, and politician
 Charles Peter Layard (1806–1893), first Mayor of Colombo
 Charles Layard (1849–1916), Chief Justice of Ceylon
 Edgar Leopold Layard (1824–1900), British ornithologist
 John Layard (1891–1974), English anthropologist and psychologist
 Nina Frances Layard (1853–1935), English poet and antiquary
 Richard Layard, Baron Layard (born 1934), British economist

See also
 Layard Theatre, Canford School, Dorset, England
 Layard's palm squirrel (Funambulus layardi), a rodent
 Layard's parakeet (Psittacula calthrapae), a parrot
 Layard's warbler (Sylvia layardi), an Old World warbler
 Layard's white-eye (Zosterops explorator), a passerine bird